Kevin Kotzur (born November 3, 1989) is an American professional basketball player for Passlab Yamagata Wyverns in Japan.

References

1989 births
Living people
Aisin AW Areions Anjo players
Altiri Chiba players
American expatriate basketball people in Japan
American men's basketball players
Basketball players from Texas
Hiroshima Dragonflies players
Kagawa Five Arrows players
Kyoto Hannaryz players
People from Wilson County, Texas
Santa Cruz Warriors players
St. Mary's Rattlers men's basketball players
Centers (basketball)
Power forwards (basketball)